The province of Florence was a province in the northeast of Tuscany region of Italy. The city or comune of Florence was both the capital of the Province of Florence, and of the Region of Tuscany. The territory of the province was the birthplace of the Italian Renaissance.

In 2015 the province was replaced by the Metropolitan City of Florence.

Geography
The Province of Florence was bordered by the Province of Bologna in the north, the Province of Ravenna and Forlì-Cesena in the north-east, the provinces of Prato, Pistoia, Pisa and Lucca in the west; the Province of Siena in the south and the Province of Arezzo in the east and southeast. Much of the province lied in the plain of the Arno river.

Government

List of presidents of the province of Florence

References

External links

 Photo gallery: Province of Florence — licensed photos.

.
Florence
2015 disestablishments in Italy
States and territories disestablished in 2015